Kuopio Cathedral is a stone Neoclassical-style Evangelical Lutheran church in Kuopio, Finland, and the seat of the Diocese of Kuopio. The cathedral was built between 1806 and 1815.

See also
 Saint Nicholas Cathedral, Kuopio
 Snellman Park

References

External links 
 

Cathedral
Lutheran cathedrals in Finland
Buildings and structures in North Savo
Churches completed in 1815
Neoclassical church buildings in Finland